A marriage market is a public place where parents list advertisements for their children with the aim of finding a marital spouse for them. People then congregate there and read the listings, often in the hope of finding a marital match. Several marriage markets exist in China, such as Shanghai's marriage market at People's Square and at several parks and other public places in Beijing, such as shopping malls.

Alternatively, a marriage market can involve the use of marriage brokers and marriage bureaus that are involved in matchmaking to unite people in marriage.  In October 2011, marriage markets in India involving the use of brokers were estimated to be a $250 billion (Indian Rupee) industry. Marriage markets using brokers exists in New Delhi, India and in several other regions of India.

See also

 Arranged marriage
 Arranged marriage in the Indian subcontinent
 Chinese marriage
 Dating in China
 Singles Day

References

Further reading
 
 
  
 

Dating
Marriage in Chinese culture
Sexuality in China